Alhaji Abdu Dawakin Tofa (1932– 2003) was a Nigerian agriculturalist and deputy of Muhammadu Abubakar Rimi who briefly served as Governor of Kano State from May and October 1983 during the Nigerian Second Republic.

Background 
Abdu Dawakin Tofa earned a Higher Diploma from the School of Agriculture, Samaru, Zaria. From 1954 to 1960, he was an agricultural assistant in the former Borno Province.
Tofa was a senior academic at the Audu Bako School of Agriculture, Dambatta when he was appointed Commissioner for Agriculture for Kano State in 1979. Later he became Commissioner for Special Duties in the cabinet of Governor Muhammadu Abubakar Rimi.

Politics 
When Deputy Governor Ibrahim Farouk was impeached, Tofa took his place. The Peoples Redemption Party (PRP) split into Santsi (Imodu) and Tabo Factions. He became the party Chairman of Kano Directorate Imodus Faction while Abdullahi Aliyu Sumaila was the party Secretary-General of the Imodus Faction Kano State Directorate. 

When Rimi moved from the People's Redemption Party (PRP) to the Nigerian People's Party (NPP) following his fall out with his political mentor Aminu Kano, in preparation for the 1983 elections he resigned from office. Tofa became governor in May 1983 and held office until October 1983. He was instrumental in establishing the Kano Agricultural Research Development Authority – KNARDA – with the goal of "the total emancipation of the common man from hunger, disease, poverty and squalor".

Corruption 
After the military government of General Muhammadu Buhari took power in the 1983 Nigeria coup d'etat, Tofa was put on trial by a special tribunal and was jailed for 21 years for offences that included receiving a N265,000 kickback for a N3.5 million contract awarded to Ashab construction company.

References

Kano State
2003 deaths
People's Redemption Party politicians
Nigerian People's Party politicians
State governors of Nigeria
1932 births
20th-century Nigerian politicians